The Seremuk River is a river in Southwest Papua, Indonesia.

Geography
The river flows in the southern area of Southwest Papua with predominantly tropical rainforest climate (designated as Af in the Köppen-Geiger climate classification). The annual average temperature in the area is 23 °C. The warmest month is December, when the average temperature is around 24 °C, and the coldest is August, at 22 °C. The average annual rainfall is 4797 mm. The wettest month is June, with an average of 662 mm rainfall, and the driest is October, with 225 mm rainfall.

See also
List of rivers of Indonesia
List of rivers of Western New Guinea
Seremuk River languages

References

Rivers of Southwest Papua 
Rivers of Indonesia